Josie Knight (born 29 March 1997) is an English professional racing cyclist who has represented Great Britain and England since 2018. Knight was part of the Great Britain team that won the silver medal in team pursuit at the 2020 Summer Olympics in Tokyo, Japan, and the 2022 UCI Track Cycling World Championships in Saint-Quentin-en-Yvelines, France. Representing England, Knight won bronze in team pursuit at the 2022 Commonwealth Games in Birmingham, England.

Although born in Buckinghamshire in England, her family moved to Dingle in Ireland in her infancy, gaining Knight Irish citizenship, and she competed for Ireland prior to 2018, winning silver with the Irish team in the European Junior Championships in team pursuit in Anadia, Portugal.

Life
Knight was born in 1997 near Aylesbury, Buckinghamshire, and she spent her childhood in County Kerry in Ireland. She said that she became a cyclist for Ireland as a youth but she did not think of herself as Irish.

She rode at the 2015 UCI Track Cycling World Championships.

Becoming British
Knight switched her allegiance from Ireland to Great Britain in 2018. She later described the Irish set-up at the time as "grim". Knight became British champion when winning the Individual Pursuit Championship at the 2020 British National Track Championships.

Knight was chosen to be part of the UK's 26-strong cycling squad for the postponed 2020 Tokyo Olympics where she is joined by Katie Archibald, Elinor Barker, Laura Kenny and Neah Evans for the endurance races. The team won the silver medal in the women's team pursuit event.

Career results
2016
2nd Omnium, Dublin Track Cycling International

References

External links
 

1997 births
Living people
Irish female cyclists
British female cyclists
Cyclists at the 2019 European Games
European Games silver medalists for Great Britain
European Games medalists in cycling
People from Dingle
Olympic cyclists of Great Britain
Cyclists at the 2020 Summer Olympics
Medalists at the 2020 Summer Olympics
Olympic medalists in cycling
Olympic silver medallists for Great Britain
Cyclists at the 2022 Commonwealth Games
Commonwealth Games competitors for England
Medallists at the 2022 Commonwealth Games
Commonwealth Games bronze medallists for England
Commonwealth Games medallists in cycling